λ Horologii, Latinised as Lambda Horologii, is a star in the southern constellation of Horologium. It is a yellow-white hued star that is dimly visible to the naked eye with an apparent visual magnitude of +5.35. Based upon parallax, this object is located 155 light years distance from the Sun. It is drifting further away with a radial velocity of +28 km/s. Although Eggleton and Tokovinin (2008) list this as a single star, according to Kunzli and North (1998) it may be a binary system with a long orbital period.

The visible component has a stellar classification of F2III, matching an evolved star that has, at the age of 1.4 billion years, become a giant. However, it has just 2.74 times the Sun's radius and shows a high rate of spin with a projected rotational velocity of +140 km/s. The star has 1.76 times the mass of the Sun and is radiating 13 times the Sun's luminosity from its photosphere at an effective temperature of 6,848 K.

References

F-type giants
Horologium (constellation)
Durchmusterung objects
015233
011258
0714